Romeo and Juliet is a 1954 British-Italian film adaptation of William Shakespeare's play of the same name. It was directed by Renato Castellani and stars Laurence Harvey as Romeo, Susan Shentall as Juliet, Flora Robson as the Nurse, Mervyn Johns as Friar Laurence, Bill Travers as Benvolio, Sebastian Cabot as Lord Capulet, Ubaldo Zollo as Mercutio, Enzo Fiermonte as Tybalt and John Gielgud as the Chorus.

The film won the Golden Lion at the Venice Film Festival, and was named the best foreign film by the National Board of Review, which also named Castellani as best director.

Plot summary

Cast
 Laurence Harvey as 	Romeo
 Susan Shentall as Juliet
 Flora Robson as 	Nurse
 Norman Wooland as	Paris
 Mervyn Johns as Friar Laurence
 John Gielgud as	Chorus
 Bill Travers as 	Benvolio
 Sebastian Cabot as 	Capulet
 Lydia Sherwood as 	Lady Capulet
 Ubaldo Zollo as 	Mercutio
 Enzo Fiermonte as 	Tybalt
 Ennio Flaiano as Prince of Verona 
 Giulio Garbinetto as 	Montague
 Nietta Zocchi as 	Lady Montague
 Thomas Nicholls as 	Brother Giovanni 
 Mario Meniconi as 	Baldassare
 Pietro Capanna	as	Sansone
 Luciano Bodi as 	Abraham

Production
Joan Collins was originally announced to play Juliet, but was replaced by Susan Shentall. It was shot at Pinewood Studios near London and on location in Italy. The costumes were designed by Leonor Fini.

Critical attention
Renato Castellani won the Grand Prix at the Venice Film Festival for his 1954 film of Romeo and Juliet. His film contains interpolated scenes intended to establish the class system and Catholicism of Renaissance Verona, and the nature of the feud. Some of Castellani's changes have been criticised as ineffective: interpolated dialogue is often banal, and the Prince's appearances are reimagined as formal hearings, undermining the spontaneity of Benvolio's defence of Romeo's behaviour in the duel scene.

The major supporting roles are vastly reduced, including that of the nurse; Mercutio becomes (in the words of Daniel Rosenthal) "the tiniest of cameos", as does Tybalt, and Friar Laurence "an irritating ditherer", although Pauline Kael, who admired the film, praised Mervyn Johns's performance, claiming that he transformed the Friar from a tiresome presence to "a radiantly silly little man". Castellani's most prominent changes related to Romeo's character, cutting back or removing scenes involving his parents, Benvolio and Mercutio in order to highlight Romeo's isolation, and inserting a parting scene in which Montague coldly pulls his banished son out of Lady Montague's farewell embrace.

Another criticism made by film scholar Patricia Tatspaugh is that the realism of the settings, so carefully established throughout the film, "goes seriously off the rails when it come to the Capulets' vault". Castellani uses competing visual images in relation to the central characters: ominous grilles (and their shadows) contrasted with frequent optimistic shots of blue sky.  The fatal encounter between Romeo and Tybalt is here not an actual fight; the enraged Romeo simply rushes up to Tybalt and stabs him, taking him by surprise.

A well-known stage Romeo, John Gielgud, played Castellani's chorus (and would reprise the role in the 1978 BBC Shakespeare version). Laurence Harvey, as Romeo, was already an experienced screen actor, who would shortly take over roles intended for the late James Dean in Walk on the Wild Side and Summer and Smoke. By contrast, Susan Shentall, as Juliet, was a secretarial student who was discovered by the director in a London pub, and was cast for her "pale sweet skin and honey-blonde hair." She surpassed the demands of the role, but married shortly after the shoot, and never returned to the screen.

Other parts were played by inexperienced actors, also: Mercutio was played by an architect, Montague by a gondolier from Venice, and the Prince by a novelist.

Critics responded to the film as a piece of cinema (its visuals were especially admired in Italy, where it was filmed) but not as a performance of Shakespeare's play: Robert Hatch in The Nation said "We had come to see a play... perhaps we should not complain that we were shown a sumptuous travelogue", and Time′s reviewer added that "Castellani's Romeo and Juliet is a fine film poem... Unfortunately it is not Shakespeare's poem!"

Commercially response to the film was underwhelming. One journalist described it as the "unchallenged flop of the year".

References

Notes

Sources

External links 
 
 
 

1954 films
Films based on Romeo and Juliet
English-language Italian films
Golden Lion winners
Films directed by Renato Castellani
1954 romantic drama films
British romantic drama films
Italian romantic drama films
United Artists films
Films shot at Pinewood Studios
1950s British films
1950s Italian films